Yoo Nam-kyu (born June 4, 1968) is a former table tennis player from South Korea who competed in the 1988, the 1992 and in the 1996 Summer Olympics.

Table tennis career

Olympics
In 1988 he won the gold medal in the men's singles and the bronze medal in the men's doubles together with Ahn Jae-hyung. Four years later he won the bronze medal in the men's doubles together with Kim Taek-soo. In Atlanta 1996 he won again the bronze medal in the men's doubles this time together with Lee Chul-seung.

World Championships
He won six World Championship medals including a gold medal in the mixed doubles with Hyun Jung-hwa at the 1989 World Table Tennis Championships.

Other
In the 1985/1986 season he played in the Swedish first league for Ängby SK. In 1986 he won the Asian Games both in singles and in team.

See also
 List of table tennis players
 List of World Table Tennis Championships medalists

References

External links
profile

1968 births
Living people
South Korean male table tennis players
Table tennis players at the 1988 Summer Olympics
Table tennis players at the 1992 Summer Olympics
Table tennis players at the 1996 Summer Olympics
Olympic table tennis players of South Korea
Olympic gold medalists for South Korea
Olympic bronze medalists for South Korea
Olympic medalists in table tennis
Asian Games medalists in table tennis
Table tennis players at the 1986 Asian Games
Table tennis players at the 1990 Asian Games
Table tennis players at the 1994 Asian Games
Medalists at the 1986 Asian Games
Medalists at the 1990 Asian Games
Medalists at the 1994 Asian Games
Asian Games gold medalists for South Korea
Asian Games silver medalists for South Korea
Asian Games bronze medalists for South Korea
South Korean table tennis coaches
Medalists at the 1988 Summer Olympics
Medalists at the 1992 Summer Olympics
Medalists at the 1996 Summer Olympics